The George R. Henderson Medal was an award established by the Franklin Institute in honor of George R. Henderson in 1924, coinciding with a $2,500 fund for the award contributed by his wife. George R. Henderson served on the Franklin Institute's Committee on Science and the Arts from 1912 until 1921. The award was designated to go to individuals who made significant contributions to railroad engineering.

In 1964, SRI International's William K. MacCurdy and Southern Pacific's William E. Thomford received the medal for achievements "in the field of railway impact control and associated car design, with resulting benefits in reducing lading and rolling stock damage".

References

Franklin Institute awards
Rail transport industry awards